Barlaam may refer to:

Barlaam, legendary teacher of Josaphat
Barlaam of Antioch (died 304), Christian martyr
Barlaam of Kiev (11th century), saint in the Russian Orthodox Church
Barlaam of Khutyn (died 1192), Russian saint
Barlaam of Seminara (c. 1290–1348), Italian scholar and theologian, notable as an opponent of Gregory Palamas
Barlaam (14th century), namesake of the Monastery of Varlaam
Barlaam (Shyshatsky) (1750–1820), defrocked Archbishop of Mogilev and Vitebsk

See also
 Balaam (disambiguation),
 Varlaam (disambiguation), Orthodox version of the name, due to the Byzantine sound shift from /b/ to /v/
 Varlam, variant of the above